Rent förbannat is a 2012 double studio album by Ulf Lundell. Shortly after the album release, Lundell performed the song "Är vi lyckliga nu?" at Skavlan. The album peaked at number one in Sweden and number 13 in Norway.

Track listing

CD 1
 Redan där 
 Är vi lyckliga nu? 
 Jag kan inte andas här längre 
 Dom fyras gäng 
 Nattvakten stjäl
 Moln utan minnen
 Arbete och bostad
 Eld i berget
 Mitt ansikte
 Hur lång är en tyst minut?
 Skiten vinner
 79%

CD 2
 Gordon Gekko
 FBL II  
 Rent förbannat 
 Snart kommer pöbeln  
 Jesus var en röst i natten
 Sjörövar-Jennys sång
 Mellan havet och rymden 
 Fula pojkar 
 Schabbelbabbel
 Kom fram ur skuggorna 
 Vi blir äldre 
 Exil

Contributors
Ulf Lundell - singer, guitar, composer, lyrics, producer
Surjo Benigh - bass
Andreas Dahlbäck - drums, percussion
Marcus Olsson - piano, electric piano
Jens Frithiof - guitar
Jan Bark - guitar
Stefan Sundström - engineer

Charts

References 

2012 albums
Ulf Lundell albums
Swedish-language albums